The National Center for Preservation Technology and Training (NCPTT) is a research, technology, and training center of the U.S. National Park Service located on the campus of Northwestern State University.  Since its founding in 1994, NCPTT has awarded over $7 million in grants for research that fulfills its mission of advancing the use of science and technology in the field of historic preservation. NCPTT undertakes research at its in-house laboratories at Lee H. Nelson Hall in Natchitoches, Louisiana. Working in the fields of archeology, architecture, landscape architecture and materials conservation, the National Center accomplishes its mission through training, education, research, technology transfer and partnerships.

History
NCPTT has its beginnings in "Technologies for Prehistoric and Historic Preservation," the Office of Technology Assessment that U.S. Congress published in September 1986. This report was requested by the House Committee on Interior and Insular Affairs to assess preservation technologies and their use by federal agencies in the implementation of laws relating to prehistoric and historic preservation. Among the major findings of this report was the need for:
Training in the use of technologies,
Studying ways to apply known technologies to preservation problems,
Improving information sharing and coordination,
Finding the appropriate fit of technologies to preservation problems,
Reducing the costs of new technologies, and
Developing standards for the application of new technologies
The report cited the critical need to establish a federally funded institution as a mechanism to coordinate research, disseminate information and provide training about new technologies in preservation.

Research
NCPTT labs include a unique environmental chamber that allows researchers to test the effects of pollutants on cultural materials.

To facilitate preservation technology research, NCPTT maintains a broad partnership base that includes National Park Service sites; other federal agencies; state and tribal historic preservation offices; universities; private corporations; and local, state, national and international non-profit organizations.

NCPTT’s website and publications enable the National Center to deliver the latest news about preservation technologies to a variety of audiences.  Additionally, its content on social media services is available through Creative Commons licenses.

Services

Grants 
The Center's PTT Grants program provides direct and competitive grants to promote research and training opportunities in preservation technology.

Research
NCPTT's website provides instantly downloadable research from the Center's hundreds of PTT Grants products.

Training
The National Center develops and conducts seminars and workshops nationwide on topics like cemetery monument conservation. NCPTT promotes excellence in preservation by promoting external historic preservation training and education opportunities for professionals.

References

External links
 NCPTT website
 NCPTT article on Preservapedia (a project sponsored by NCPTT)

National Park Service
1994 establishments in Louisiana
Historic preservation organizations in the United States
Conservation and restoration training